Debora B. Pignatelli (born October 25, 1947) is an American politician. A Democrat, she is the former New Hampshire Executive Council member for District Five.

Pignatelli was born in Hoboken, New Jersey and lives in Nashua, New Hampshire. She received her bachelor's degree from the University of Denver. She also went to Northeastern University. Pignatelli worked for the Nashua Public Housing Authority as director of tenant services and as Executive Director for the Nashua Girl's Club. Pignatelli served in the New Hampshire House of Representatives from 1986 to 1992. She then served in the New Hampshire Senate from 1992 to 2002. Pignatelli served in the New Hampshire Executive Council from 2004 to 2010 and from 2012 to 2014.

Electoral history 
2020 NH executive council election district 5

(R) Dave Wheeler 50.5%

(D) Deborah Pignatelli 49.5%

2018 NH executive council election district 5

(D) Deborah Pignatelli 50.5%

(R) Dave Wheeler 46.5%

(L) Brian Chabot 2.9%

Notes

1957 births
Living people
Members of the Executive Council of New Hampshire
Democratic Party members of the New Hampshire House of Representatives
Democratic Party New Hampshire state senators
Northeastern University alumni
Politicians from Hoboken, New Jersey
Politicians from Nashua, New Hampshire
University of Denver alumni
Women state legislators in New Hampshire
21st-century American women